Tegula gruneri is a species of sea snail, a marine gastropod mollusk in the family Tegulidae.

Description
The height of the shell attains 6 mm, its diameter 10 mm. The shell is much more depressed than Tegula fasciata and has a discoidal shape. It is widely umbilicate. The surface is sculptured by numerous spiral slightly elevated lirulae, which are red, more or less articulated with white dots. The periphery shows frequently two or several more prominent lirae.

Distribution
This species occurs in the Caribbean Sea, the Gulf of Mexico and off the Lesser Antilles in the subtidal zone.

References

 Rosenberg, G., F. Moretzsohn, and E. F. García. 2009. Gastropoda (Mollusca) of the Gulf of Mexico, Pp. 579–699 in Felder, D.L. and D.K. Camp (eds.), Gulf of Mexico–Origins, Waters, and Biota. Biodiversity. Texas A&M Press, College Station, Texas

External links
 

gruneri
Gastropods described in 1849